This list of protected areas of Myanmar includes national parks, wildlife sanctuaries and botanical gardens that were established since 1927.

National parks
 Alaungdaw Kathapa National Park in Sagaing Region, 
 Hkakaborazi National Park in Kachin State, 
 Lampi Island Marine National Park in Tanintharyi Region, 
 Natmataung National Park in Chin State, 
 Popa Mountain National Park in Mandalay Region

Wildlife sanctuaries
 Bumhpa Bum Wildlife Sanctuary in Kachin State, 
 Chatthin Wildlife Sanctuary in Sagaing Region, 
 Htamanthi Wildlife Sanctuary in Sagaing Region, 
 Hukaung Valley Wildlife Sanctuary in Kachin State,  plus extension of  
 Indawgyi Lake Wildlife Sanctuary in Kachin State, 
 Inlay Lake Wetland Sanctuary in Shan State, 
 Kahilu Wildlife Sanctuary
 Kyauk Pan Taung Wildlife Sanctuary in Chin state
 Kelatha Wildlife Sanctuary in Mon State
 Kyaikhtiyo Wildlife Sanctuary in Mon State, 
 Loimwe Protected Area in Shan State, .
 Mahamyaing Wildlife Sanctuary in Sagaing Region, 
 Mein-ma-hla Kyun Wildlife Sanctuary in Ayeyarwady Region, 
 Minwuntaung Wildlife Sanctuary in Sagaing Region, 
 Minsontaung Wildlife Sanctuary in Mandalay Region, 
 Moeyungyi Wetland Wildlife Sanctuary in Bago Region, 
 Moscos Islands Wildlife Sanctuary in Tanintharyi Region, 
 Mulayit Wildlife Sanctuary in Kayin State, 
 Panlaung and Padalin Cave Wildlife Sanctuary in Shan State, 
 Parsar Protected Area in Shan State, 
 Pidaung Wildlife Sanctuary in Kachin State, 
 Pyin-O-Lwin Bird Sanctuary in Mandalay Region, 
 Rakhine Yoma Elephant Reserve in Rakhine State, 
 Shwesettaw Wildlife Reserve in Magwe Region, 
 Shwe-U-Daung Wildlife Sanctuary
 Thamihla Kyun Wildlife Sanctuary in Ayeyarwady Region, 
 Tanintharyi Nature Reserve in the Tenasserim Hills, 
 Taunggyi Bird Sanctuary in the Shan Hills, 
 Wethtigan Wildlife Sanctuary in Magwe Region,

Nature Parks
 Hlawga Park in northern Yangon Region, 
 Myaing Hay Wun Elephant Park in Yangon Region
 National Kandawgyi Botanical Gardens in Mandalay Region
 Sein Ye Forest Park in Bago Region

See also 
 Deforestation in Myanmar

References

External links
 

 
Myanmar

Protected areas